Tanja Schuck is a German sprint canoer who has competed since the mid-2000s. She won a silver medal in the K-4 1000 m event at the 2006 ICF Canoe Sprint World Championships in Szeged.

References

German female canoeists
Living people
Year of birth missing (living people)
ICF Canoe Sprint World Championships medalists in kayak